Diguva Sivada is a village in Rowthulapudi Mandal, Kakinada district in the state of Andhra Pradesh in India.

Geography 

Demographics 
 India census, Diguva Sivada had a population of 677, out of which 359 were male and 318 were female. The population of children below 6 years of age was 65. The literacy rate of the village was 45.42%.

References 

Villages in Rowthulapudi mandal